Hydroporinae is a subfamily of predaceous diving beetles in the family Dytiscidae. There are at least 2,200 described species in Hydroporinae.

See also
 List of Hydroporinae genera

References

Further reading

External links

 NCBI Taxonomy Browser, Hydroporinae

Dytiscidae